Levy County is a county located on the Gulf coast in the northwestern part of the U.S. state of Florida. As of the 2020 census, the population was 42,915. Its county seat is Bronson.

History
Levy County was created in 1845, after the Seminole Wars. It was named for David Levy Yulee, a planter elected in 1841 as the state's territorial delegate to the US House of Representatives, where he served two terms.

Levy provided for long-term development in the state by constructing the first railroad across Florida, the Florida Railroad, linking the deep-water ports of Fernandina (Port of Fernandina) on the Atlantic Ocean and Cedar Key on the Gulf of Mexico.

The Rosewood Massacre occurred in Levy County in the first week of January 1923. White citizens from the nearby town of Sumner, reacting to a what turned out to be a false accusation that a black man raped a white woman, burned the predominantly black town of Rosewood to the ground and brutally murdered several of Rosewood's black citizens. A film based on the incident was made in 1997, but was not filmed in Levy County.

Geography

Adjacent counties
 Dixie County — west
 Gilchrist County — north
 Alachua County — northeast
 Marion County — east
 Citrus County — south

National protected areas
 Cedar Keys National Wildlife Refuge
 Lower Suwannee National Wildlife Refuge (part)

Demographics

As of the 2020 United States census, there were 42,915 people, 16,971 households, and 10,747 families residing in the county.

As of the census of 2000, there were 34,450 people, 13,867 households, and 9,679 families residing in the county. The population density was 31 people per square mile (12/km2). There were 16,570 housing units at an average density of 15 per square mile (6/km2). The racial makeup of the county was 85.88% White, 10.97% Black or African American, 0.47% Native American, 0.37% Asian, 0.03% Pacific Islander, 0.96% from other races, and 1.32% from two or more races. 3.89% of the population were Hispanic or Latino of any race.

There were 13,867 households, out of which 27.40% had children under the age of 18 living with them, 53.40% were married couples living together, 11.80% had a female householder with no husband present, and 30.20% were non-families. 24.90% of all households were made up of individuals, and 11.60% had someone living alone who was 65 years of age or older. The average household size was 2.44 and the average family size was 2.88.

In the county, the population was spread out, with 23.60% under the age of 18, 6.90% from 18 to 24, 25.00% from 25 to 44, 26.60% from 45 to 64, and 17.90% who were 65 years of age or older. The median age was 41 years. For every 100 females there were 94.00 males. For every 100 females age 18 and over, there were 90.80 males.

The median income for a household in the county was $26,959, and the median income for a family was $30,899. Males had a median income of $26,029 versus $20,252 for females. The per capita income for the county was $14,746. About 15.00% of families and 18.60% of the population were below the poverty line, including 25.80% of those under age 18 and 12.90% of those age 65 or over.

Proposed nuclear power plant

On April 7, 2008, Progress Energy Florida of St. Petersburg announced it had authorized Shaw and Westinghouse to purchase long-lead-time materials for up to two AP1000 nuclear reactors for its Levy County plant, a greenfield plant in Levy County, producing about 1,100 MW each.

Progress expects to apply for a Combined Construction and Operating License (COL) in the summer of 2008, according to a spokeswoman. Southern Company and SCANA, of whom each own an interest in the plant, would not reveal cost estimates, but Progress has said its plant will cost $14 billion, with an additional $3 billion required for transmission infrastructure.

Applying for a COL does not commit the utilities to construct the plant, but it is part of the licensing process, say officials of all the utilities. The application starts a 40-month review by the Nuclear Regulatory Commission, meaning that approval could come in August 2011.

In late July, 2013 the company said it had scrapped its plan to build the plant.

Politics

Voter registration
According to the Secretary of State's office, Republicans comprise a plurality of registered voters in Levy County.

Education

Public schools
School Board of Levy County operates public schools.

Public libraries
The current Levy County Library Director is Jeanine Turner.

The Levy County Public Library System has five branches:
 Bronson Public Library

600 Gilbert Street
Bronson, FL 32621
Phone: (352) 486-2015
 Cedar Key Public Library

460 Second Street
Cedar Key, FL 32625
Phone: (352) 543-5777
 Luther Callaway Public Library

104 NE 3rd Street
Chiefland, FL 32626
Phone: (352) 493-2758
 Williston Public Library

10 SE 1st Street
Williston, FL 32696
Phone: (352)  528-2313
 A.F. Knotts Public Library

11 56th Street
Yankeetown, FL 34498
Phone: (352) 447-4212

Transportation

Airports
 George T. Lewis Airport
 Williston Municipal Airport
 Ames Field

Railroads
Levy County has only one railroad line running throughout the county, and only within eastern Levy along US 41. The line is a former Atlantic Coast Line Railroad line that is now used by the Florida Northern Railroad for freight to the Crystal River 3 Nuclear Power Plant in Red Level, Citrus County. Notable abandoned lines include a Seaboard Air Line Railroad line that is in proximity to the existing former ACL line, a Florida Railway and Navigation Company line running parallel to State Road 24, and a third in western and southern Levy County that spans from Fanning Springs towards the Dunnellon area running along US 19-98 until it reaches Lebanon Junction, where it runs along CR 336. The segment of that line between Fanning Springs and Chiefland is part of the Nature Coast State Trail.

Major roads

   U.S. Route 19/U.S. Route 98 is the main local road through western Levy County, running south to north.
  U.S. Route 27 runs northwest to southeast from Marion County and joins US 41 in Williston on its way to High Springs.
  Alternate 27 is a bannered alternate of US 27 that runs northwest and southeast from US 27/US 41/SR 121 in Williston to US 19/US 98 in Chiefland, which it joins on its way to Perry.
  U.S. Route 41 is the main local road through eastern Levy County, running south to north. Until the north end of the concurrency with SR 121 in Williston, the road is also shared by the DeSoto Trail.
  U.S. Route 129 is an auxiliary route of US 29 that runs northeast from Chiefland, and then turns north in Trenton on its way through Jasper before heading north into Georgia.
  State Road 24 is an east to west highway through the central part of the county from Cedar Key into Alachua County. A county-suffixed alternate route can be found in Bronson.
  State Road 121 is a south to north road that runs southwest to northeast from Lebanon Junction through Williston, and then into Alachua County and beyond, as it takes a long journey through Georgia and South Carolina as a tri-state de facto auxiliary route from U.S. Route 21 in Rock Hill, South Carolina.
  State Road 320 is an east–west route connecting Manatee Springs State Park with US 19/98/Alternate US 27 in Chiefland. A county extension of the road exists north of the eastern terminus with US 19/98/ALT 27 leading to CR 339 in Newton.
   State and County Road 345 is a combined county and state road spanning from Rosewood to Chiefland.
  County Road 40 runs mostly east and west through southern Levy County. It spans from the Gulf of Mexico in Yankeetown winding along the Withlacoochee River, on the way to Dunnellon and Rainbow Lakes Estates in Marion County, where it eventually becomes State Road 40. The segment between the Gulf of Mexico and US 19-98 is officially named Follow That Dream Boulevard, after the 1962 Elvis Presley movie.
  County Road 326 runs mostly east and west through southeastern Levy County as a bi-county extension of State Road 326. It spans from a dead end at the Waccasassa River in Gulf Hammock winding northeast through US 19-98 until it reaches CR 343 where it turns east. After running through Goethe State Forest it intersects CR 337 in Morris Junction, and then SR 121. By the time it reaches eastern Levy County it has a brief multiplex with southbound US 41 where both serve as the southern terminus of CR 323, only for CR 326 to turn east again as it eventually crosses the Levy-Marion County line, on the way to Ocala and Silver Springs. The segment between I-75 (Exit 358) and SR 40 becomes a state road.
  County Road 336 is a bi-county road that runs mostly southeast and northwest through southwestern Levy County in two segments. It spans from CR 347 southwest of Chiefland, along various local streets, and even overlaps CR 345, then runs southeast toward SR 24 at Otter Creek. From there it is hidden along local streets that merge with US 19-98, which completely overshadows it until the at-grade interchange with SR 121 in Lebanon Junction, where it is exposed again running through the southern segment of Goethe State Forest, and later crosses the Levy-Marion County line, where it overlaps CR 40 all the way to Dunnellon.
  County Road 337 is a tri-county road that runs south and north through central Levy County, as well as southwestern Alachua and eastern Gilchrist counties. It spans from CR 336 in Goethe State Forest and runs primarily along the eastern outskirts of the forest occasionally entering some forest land. North of the forest area, it enters the city of Bronson, where it intersects US Alternate 27, SR 24 and CR 32. Further north of the city limits it crosses the Levy-Alachua County line.

Communities

Other unincorporated communities

 Ellzey
 Fowlers Bluff
 Gulf Hammock
 Lebanon Station
 Rosewood
 Sumner
 Turkeytown
 Usher
 Wakahoota

Ghost communities

 Ablion
 Butler
 Double sink
 Elmwood
 Eve
 Janney
 Judson
 Levyville
 Lontine
 Merdiths
 Moody
 Montbrook

See also
 National Register of Historic Places listings in Levy County, Florida

Notes

References

External links

Newspapers and media
 "HardisonInk.com" Daily online news website for Levy, Dixie and Gilchrist counties.
 Levy County Journal No longer in business. Publisher died.
 LCJ archives maintained by University of Florida
 Cedar Key Beacon
 Chiefland Citizen
 Williston Pioneer

Government links/Constitutional offices
 Levy County official website
 Levy County Supervisor of Elections
 Levy County Property Appraiser
 Levy County Sheriff's Office
 Levy County Tax Collector

Special districts
 Levy County School Board
 Suwannee River Water Management District
 Southwest Florida Water Management District

Judicial branch
 Levy County Clerk of Courts
 Office of the State Attorney, 8th Judicial Circuit of Florida serving Alachua, Baker, Bradford, Gilchrist, Levy, and Union counties
 Circuit and County Court for the 8th Judicial Circuit of Florida

Tourism links/Chambers of Commerce
 Levy County Visitors Bureau
 Withlacoochee/Gulf Area Chamber of Commerce
 Cedar Key Chamber of Commerce
 Greater Chiefland Chamber of Commerce
 Fanning Springs Chamber of Commerce
 Cedar Key Scrub State Preserve
 Cedar Keys National Wildlife Refuge
 Goethe State Forest
 Manatee Springs State Park

 
Florida counties
1845 establishments in Florida
North Florida
Populated places established in 1845